W. Lance Bennett (born 14 April 1948) is an American political scientist.

Bennett earned a doctorate from Yale University in 1974, and subsequently joined the University of Washington faculty, where he serves as Ruddick C. Lawrence Professor of Communication and professor of political science.

References

Living people
American political scientists
University of Washington faculty
Yale Graduate School of Arts and Sciences alumni
1948 births